Pasapalabra is an Argentine television program that replicates the format of the Spanish program of the same name, which in turn is based on the British contest The Alphabet Game, and has been broadcast in intervals since 2002. It began on 7 January 2002, on Azul TV with Claribel Medina. In January 2016, 15 years later, the format returned to broadcast television with Iván de Pineda as host for El trece, until the end of 2020. Months later, the network Telefe acquired the rights and revived the production, starting on 1 March 2021.

History 
The program featured the hosting of Claribel Medina in January 2002 on Azul TV and then returned in 2016 completely renewed, on eltrece and hosted by Iván de Pineda . Since then, it has broadcast four uninterrupted seasons.

In April 2020, due to the coronavirus pandemic, the cycle went off the air after several repetitions.

In November 2020, it was confirmed that the program would return in the first quarter of 2021 but this time on Telefe.

Format 
The program consists of two teams (blue and orange) of three people, where the captain is the participant, who is accompanied by two famous guests. During the first stage of the chapter, the teams compete in different games whose objective is the sum of seconds for the final game, called "the rosco". In the latter only the captains play, who compete for the jackpot. The winner of the chapter that does not complete "the rosco" will be able to continue participating in the next one.

Hosts

Games 
This is the list of games prior to the rosco.

 Track
 The Music Track
 The Music Track (International)
 One Of Four
 Tutti Frutti
 Spell the word
 Where are they?
 Crossing words
 Alphabet soup
 How is this written?
 Acted Words
 Weaponword
 Who are they?
 Vowels and consonants

Winners 

Since 2016, there have been six winners of the Roscoː Horacio Moavro, Diego Aira, Martina Barraza, Camilo Rubio, Diego Ramos and Brian Parkinson. Below is a table with the amounts won in the rosco over the last four seasons. In some cases, an amount earned in Argentine pesos translates into a lower amount in dollars due to the devaluation suffered by Argentina in recent years. The champions faced each other five times. On two occasions, Diego Aira defeated Martina Barraza and on another Diego Aira defeated Camilo Rubio. On one occasion Brian Parkinson defeated Martina Barraza and on another Martina Barraza defeated Brian Parkinson.

Participants

Champions who did not win the Rosco 
There were also other champions who stayed many programs but could not take the Roscoː

 Ramiro Faríasː 68 programs (before his definitive defeat he lost twice but on both occasions he returned to the program the following day after winning the repechage).
 Diego Pokorski: 47 programs
 Ivanna Hrycː 31 programs
 Carol Legnazzi: 26 programs
 Sergio Rodríguez: 17 programs
 Gabriel Estrany: 13 programs

References

External links 
  – Pasapalabra (El Trece)
  – Pasapalabra (Telefe)

Telefe original programming